Cheng Yinghua (born 24 November 1958) is a Chinese-born table tennis player who represented the United States at the 2000 Summer Olympics.

References

1958 births
Living people
Table tennis players from Chongqing
American male table tennis players
Chinese male table tennis players
Table tennis players at the 2000 Summer Olympics
Olympic table tennis players of the United States
Chinese emigrants to the United States
Naturalised table tennis players